Novosovetsky is a rural locality (a settlement) in Novoyegoryevsky Selsoviet, Yegoryevsky District, Altai Krai, Russia. The population was 24 as of 2013. There is 1 street.

Geography 
Novosovetsky is located on the Kormikha River, 22 km northwest of Novoyegoryevskoye (the district's administrative centre) by road. Rechka-Kormikha is the nearest rural locality.

References 

Rural localities in Yegoryevsky District, Altai Krai